Far as Human Eye Could See: Essays on Science (published 1987) is a  collection of science essays by American writer and scientist Isaac Asimov, short works which originally appeared in The Magazine of Fantasy and Science Fiction (F&SF), these being first published between November 1984 and March 1986.

Contents
(with date of original publication):
Part One: Physical Chemistry
"Made, Not Found" (December 1984)
"Salt and Battery" (February 1985)
"Current Affairs" (March 1985)
"Forcing the Lines" (April 1985)
"Arise, Fair Sun!" (May 1985)
Part Two: Biochemistry
"Poison in the Negative" (July 1985)
"Tracing the Traces" (August 1985)
"The Goblin Element" (September 1985)
"A Little Leaven" (October 1985)
"The Biochemical Knife-Blade" (November 1985)
Part Three: Geochemistry
"Far, Far Below" (January 1985)
Part Four: Astronomy
"Time is Out of Joint" (February 1986)
"The Discovery of the Void" (December 1985)
"Chemistry of the Void" (January 1986)
"The Rule of Numerous Small" (June 1985)
"Superstar:" (March 1986)
" Far as Human Eye Could See" (November 1984)

External links
Asimovonline.com

Scientific essays
Essay collections by Isaac Asimov
1987 books
Works originally published in The Magazine of Fantasy & Science Fiction
Doubleday (publisher) books